This is a list of notable events in Latin music (music from Spanish- and Portuguese-speaking regions of Latin America, Latin Europe, and the United States) that took place in 2016.

Events
February 24: Spanish singer Enrique Iglesias is recognized by the Guinness World Record for having the most number one songs on the Billboard Hot Latin Songs chart and the longest running song with "Bailando".
February 25: "Ginza by J Balvin sets the record for the longest-leading song at number one on the Hot Latin Songs by a solo artist. The song spent 21 weeks at No. 1 on the chart.
March 31:
The 22nd annual Broadcast Music Inc. Latin music awards is held. Mexican pop singer Gloria Trevi is awarded the President's Award for her contributions to the Latin pop field.
Sergio George signs with Marc Anthony's label Magnus Media, the new deal "will oversee George's interests in all areas of the entertainment industry throughout the [popular market]".
April 21: Singer-songwriter José Miguel Fernández Sastrón is elected president of the Spanish Society of Authors and Editors (SGAE).
April 22:
In a report by Nielsen, the purchasing power of Latinos in the United States was at $1.5 trillion. With an average annual spending of $135 on music, the report found Hispanics spending more money than their non-Hispanic counterparts.
Billboard magazine announced Marco Antonio Solis to receive the Lifetime Achievement Award after releasing twelve albums peaking at number one on the U.S. Top Latin Albums chart in his career, the most of any artist.
For the May 2, 2016 issue of Billboard magazine, Leila Cobo interviewed female music executives and Chiquis Rivera, Leslie Grace, and Carla Morrison on the declining presence of females on Billboard music charts.
April 25 – 28: The 2016 annual Billboard Latin Music Conference is held.
June 7: At the 2016 Gardel Awards, Argentine rock singer Luis Alberto Spinetta's posthumous released album Los Amigo (2012) receives Album of the Year honor. Afro-Uruguayan singer Ruben Rada was named Male Pop Artist of the Year and Production of the Year, while Argentine rock band Ciro y Los Persas' song "Antes y Después" won Song of the Year. Other winners included Litto Nebia for Best Rock Album, and Julieta Rada for Best New Pop Album.
June 8: American hip-hop recording artist Jay Z appoints bachata singer Romeo Santos as CEO of the newly formed Roc Nation Latino.
June 9: Former American Society of Composers, Authors and Publishers (ASCAP) A&R representative, Ana Rosa Santiago became acting VIP president of the Latin division of Universal Music Publishing Group.
June 12: Following the Orlando nightclub shooting (which occurred during a Latin night event), Latin music events throughout Orange County, Florida are uncertain if future events will be canceled. Latin DJ Candy Boy, spoke out on the lack of security at events he has hosted, while Latin music acts such as Proyecto Uno, Ilegales, Pitbull, Prince Royce, and Farruko, have upcoming shows that may be affected as a result of the events that occurred.
June 25: The first Festival Chispa took place in Albuquerque, New Mexico, focusing on Latin music and culture at the National Hispanic Cultural Center.
June 26: Despite a decrease on physical and digital consumption in the United States, Latin America was found by the International Federation of the Phonographic Industry (IFPI) to have been the only region to have the highest growth rate for the fifth consecutive time. Digital sales were up 44.5 percent and music streaming increased to 80.4 percent. The study found that Brazil and Argentina were the two largest markets. The Recording Industry Association of America (RIAA), found that Latin music overall decrease 6.3 percent from the previous year.
July 2: Alan Ramírez, who is the lead singer of Banda Sinaloense MS de Sergio Lizárraga, was shot in the neck during a Mexico City tour. He is currently in the hospital and is expected to recover.
July 4: The inaugural Lollapalooza Colombia was canceled after Barbadian singer Rihanna dropped out and organizers failing to find a replacement.
July 7: The Hollywood Chamber of Commerce announced the class of 2017 for their Hollywood Walk of Fame inductees including Selena and announced Pitbull's induction set for July 15.
July 8
Salsa singer Victor Manuelle's "Imaginar" became the singer's 28th chart-topper, breaking the tie with Marc Anthony for most number ones on the Tropical Songs chart. With "Imaginar", Manuelle tied with Spanish singer Enrique Iglesias for most Latin number one singles.
The New York City annual Latin Alternative Music Conference commenced, which catered the Latin alternative scene.
September 9: iHeartRadio announces the creation of the iHeartLatino, a division dedicated to Latin music, a first for a major radio station company. The division is led by Enrique Santos.
November 17: The 17th Annual Latin Grammy Awards are held at the T-Mobile Arena in Paradise, Nevada.
"La Bicicleta" by Carlos Vives and Shakira wins the Latin Grammy Awards for Song of the Year and Record of the Year. 
Juan Gabriel posthumously wins the Latin Grammy Award for Album of the Year for Los Dúo, Vol. 2
Manuel Medrano wins Best New Artist.
American singer Marc Anthony is honored as the Latin Recording Academy Person of the Year.

Bands reformed 
Amber Rose (1997–2000)
Bandana (2001–2004)

Number-ones albums and singles by country
List of Hot 100 number-one singles of 2016 (Brazil)
List of number-one songs of 2016 (Colombia)
List of number-one albums of 2016 (Mexico)
List of number-one songs of 2016 (Mexico)
List of number-one albums of 2016 (Portugal)
List of number-one albums of 2016 (Spain)
List of number-one singles of 2016 (Spain)
List of number-one Billboard Latin Albums from the 2010s
List of number-one Billboard Hot Latin Songs of 2016
List of number-one singles of 2016 (Venezuela)

Awards
2016 Premio Lo Nuestro
2016 Billboard Latin Music Awards
2016 Latin American Music Awards
2016 Latin Grammy Awards
2016 Tejano Music Awards

Albums released

First quarter

January

February

March

Second quarter

April

May

June

Third quarter

July

August

September

October

November

December

Best-selling records

Best-selling albums
The following is a list of the top 10 best-selling Latin albums in the United States in 2016, according to Billboard.

Best-performing songs
The following is a list of the top 10 best-performing Latin songs in the United States in 2016, according to Billboard.

Deaths
January 1Gilberto Mendes, 93, Brazilian composer
January 6Alfredo "Chocolate" Armenteros, 87, Cuban trumpeter
January 10Hernán Gamboa, 69, Venezuelan musician, original member of Serenata Guayanesa group
February 3Alba Solís, 88, Argentine singer and actress
February 23Rey Caney, 89, Cuban musician.
March 9Naná Vasconcelos, 71, Brazilian jazz percussionist and vocalist
April 1Candita Batista, 99, Cuban singer
April 2
, 64, Spanish singer.
Gato Barbieri, 83, Argentine jazz saxophonist, pneumonia.
April 11,83, Argentine bandoneon musician, composer, and music director
April 13Mariano Mores, 98, Argentine tango composer and pianist.
April 16
Peter Rock, 70, Austrian-born Chilean rock musician
Ismael Quintana, 78, Puerto Rican singer and composer.
May 15Cauby Peixoto, 85, Brazilian singer, pneumonia 
May 16Emilio Navaira, 53, American country and Tejano singer (Life Is Good), heart failure.
June 7, 64, Spanish Flamenco singer.
June 11, 72, Spanish musician and composer.
June 12Adrian Posse, 67, Argentine composer, producer, and industry executive.
June 13Jose Lugo, 56, American musician, pianist, producer, and arranger.
June 19Alejandro Jano Fuentes, 45, The Voice Mexico (murdered).
June 20Chayito Valdez, 71, Mexican-born American folk singer and actress, complications from a cerebral hemorrhage.
June 29Inocente Carreño, 96, Venezuelan composer
June 30Juan Habichuela, 82–83, Spanish flamenco guitarist
July 6Alirio Díaz, 92, Venezuelan classical guitarist and composer.
July 11Rick Marroquin, 45, Creative Artists Agency member, worked on Hispanic marketing (lung cancer)
July 12Lupe De La Cruz, music executive marketing on EMI Latin and Univision Records
July 13El Lebrijano, 75, Spanish flamenco singer
July 24Horacio Olivo, 83, Puerto Rican actor and singer.
August 5Vander Lee, 50, Brazilian singer-songwriter.
August 6Guillermo Anderson, 54, Honduran musician, thyroid cancer.
August 7Dolores Vargas, 80, Spanish singer, complications of leukemia.
August 19Horacio Salgán, 100, Argentine tango musician.
August 28Juan Gabriel, 66, Mexican singer-songwriter.
September 12Tavin Pumarejo, 84, Puerto Rican actor, comedian and jíbaro singer.
September 29, 80, Argentine bandoneon, music director, composer and arranger
October 9Quique Lucca, 103, Puerto Rican centenarian, founder of La Sonora Ponceña.
October 27Nelson Pinedo, 88, Colombian singer (Sonora Matancera).
December 18Gustavo Quintero, 76, Colombian singer-songwriter

References

 
Latin music by year